The Alpine LDS Church Meetinghouse at 50 N. Main in Alpine, Utah was constructed during the period from 1857 to 1863. It includes Greek Revival architecture and was built by Thomas J. McCullough and others.  It has also been known as Alpine Pioneer Relic Hall. It was listed on the National Register of Historic Places in 1990. It was finished during 1863 and was dedicated later in 1863 by Brigham Young.

External links
National Register of Historic Places

References 

Churches completed in 1857
Former churches in Utah
Former Latter Day Saint religious buildings and structures
Meetinghouses of the Church of Jesus Christ of Latter-day Saints in Utah
Churches on the National Register of Historic Places in Utah
Religious buildings and structures in Utah County, Utah
1857 establishments in Utah Territory
National Register of Historic Places in Utah County, Utah
Alpine, Utah
Buildings and structures in Utah County, Utah